The Haquira mine is a large copper mine located in the south of Peru in Apurímac Region. Haquira represents one of the largest copper reserve in Peru and in the world having estimated reserves of 1.98 billion tonnes of ore grading 0.2% copper.

See also 
List of mines in Peru

Zinc mining

References 

Copper mines in Peru